Valentin Aleksandrovich Granatkin (Ryblovo, Bronnitsky Uyezd, Moscow Governorate, Russian Empire — 2 November 1979, Moscow, RSFSR, USSR) was a Soviet football, bandy, and ice hockey player, and later a sports official. He graduated from the Higher Party School of the Communist Party. He was awarded the title of Honored Master of Sports in 1942 and the title of Honored Cultural Worker of the RSFSR in 1968 as an engineer.

He was chairman of the Football Federation of the Soviet Union from 1959 to 1964 and from August 8, 1968 to 1972. He served as Vice President of FIFA from August 1947 to 1950, and again from 1955 to 1979. In addition, he was chairman of the FIFA Amateur Committee from 1968 to 1979.

See also
 Granatkin Memorial

References

External links
 Чемпионат.ру: Полномочный представитель советского футбола
 Биография Гранаткина на сайте турнира, посвящённого его памяти
 Скажите, какая ФИФА!

1908 births
1979 deaths
People from Ramensky District
People from Bronnitsky Uyezd
Communist Party of the Soviet Union members
FIFA officials
Russian football chairmen and investors
Soviet sportspeople
Soviet footballers
FC Lokomotiv Moscow players
Soviet bandy players
Soviet ice hockey players
HC Spartak Moscow players
Association football goalkeepers
Honoured Masters of Sport of the USSR
Recipients of the Order of the Red Banner of Labour
Burials at Kuntsevo Cemetery